

I

J

K 

I